Pusiola celida is a moth in the subfamily Arctiinae. It was described by George Thomas Bethune-Baker in 1911. It is found in Angola, Cameroon, the Democratic Republic of the Congo, Equatorial Guinea, Ghana, Guinea, Nigeria, Sierra Leone and Uganda.

References

Natural History Museum Lepidoptera generic names catalog

Moths described in 1911
Lithosiini
Moths of Africa